Too Late to Worry – Too Blue to Cry is the second album by American singer-guitarist Glen Campbell, released in 1963 by Capitol Records.

Track listing
Side 1
 "Walking the Floor Over You" (Ernest Tubb) – 2:30
 "I'll Hold You in My Heart" (Eddy Arnold, Hall Horton, Tommy Dilbeck) – 2:45
 "Be Honest with Me" (Gene Autry, Fred Rose) – 2:35
 "Oh My Darlin'" (Traditional; arranged by Glen Campbell and Jerry Capehart) – 2:45
 "Tomorrow Never Comes" (Ernest Tubb, Johnny Bond) – 2:25
 "Too Late to Worry – Too Blue to Cry" (Al Dexter) – 2:30

Side 2
 "Here I Am" (Glen Campbell, Mark Douglas) – 2:25
 "I Hang My Head and Cry" (Gene Autry, Fred Rose, Ray Whitley) – 2:27
 "When You Cry, You Cry Alone" (Wesley Tuttle, Merle Travis, Tex Atchison) – 2:20
 "How Do I Tell My Heart Not to Break" (Jerry Capehart, Glen Campbell) – 2:15
 "It's Been So Long Darlin'" (Ernest Tubb) – 2:30
 "Long Black Limousine" (Vern Stovall, Bobby George) – 2:15

Personnel
Music
 Glen Campbell – vocals, acoustic guitar
 Carl Tandberg – bass
 Allen Reuss – acoustic guitar
 Donald Frost – drums

Production
 Nick Venet – producer
 Jimmie Haskell – arranger, conductor
 Ken Veeder/Capitol Photo Studio – photography

Charts
Singles – Billboard (United States)

References

Glen Campbell albums
1963 albums
Capitol Records albums
Albums produced by Nick Venet
Albums arranged by Jimmie Haskell
Albums conducted by Jimmie Haskell
Albums recorded at Capitol Studios